Dragon Rocks is a 322 km2 nature reserve in the south-east of the wheatbelt region of Western Australia, some 310 km east-south-east of Perth.  It is surrounded by farmland.   It is listed on Australia's Register of the National Estate as an area significant for rare species of plants and animals.

Flora and fauna
The reserve contains 28 different vegetation associations, including heaths, woodlands, low forests, mallee and kwongan. The large number of plant communitiess form a complex mosaic characteristic of wheatbelt vegetation, including vegetation communities occurring on laterite.  Sixteen 16 plants, including 13 eucalypts, are endemic either to the wheatbelt region or to Western Australia.  The rare Lake Varley grevillea is found in the reserve.

Frog species found in the reserve include Günther's toadlet and the spotted-thighed frog.  Reptiles present include at least three legless lizards and three geckos.  The honey possum, Gilbert's dunnart and the red-tailed phascogale are present.

The reserve has been identified as an Important Bird Area because it supports populations of the endangered Carnaby's black-cockatoo, malleefowl, western rosella, blue-breasted fairy-wren, purple-gaped honeyeater and western yellow robin.

References

Notes

Sources
 
 

Nature reserves in Western Australia
Wheatbelt (Western Australia)
Important Bird Areas of Western Australia